Paolo Dal Fiume (born 23 January 1953, in Giacciano con Baruchella) is a retired Italian footballer who played as a midfielder.

External links
 
 

1953 births
Living people
Italian footballers
Association football midfielders
Serie A players
Serie B players
Torino F.C. players
S.S.D. Varese Calcio players
AS Cannes players
A.C. Perugia Calcio players
S.S.C. Napoli players
Udinese Calcio players
U.S. Catanzaro 1929 managers